Migdal Eder may refer to:

Migdal Eder, an Orthodox Jewish farming community founded in 1927 at the modern-day Kfar Etzion settlement
Migdal Eder (biblical location), a biblical tower once standing near Bethlehem